The Sijori was established in 1994 between three countries, Indonesia, Malaysia and Singapore, to strengthen economic links in the region and optimise the complementarity between the three countries. It started off as the SIJORI Growth Triangle in 1989, which includes Singapore, Johor (in Malaysia), and a part of Riau Islands Province (in Indonesia), specifically the Riau Archipelago.

History
The SIJORI Growth Triangle is a partnership arrangement between Singapore, Johor (in Malaysia), and Riau Islands (in Indonesia) that combines the competitive strengths of the three areas to make the subregion more attractive to regional and international investors. More specifically, it links the infrastructure, capital, and expertise of Singapore with the natural and labour resources and the abundance of land of Johor and Riau.

The SIJORI Growth Triangle was first publicly announced in 1989 by Singapore Deputy Prime Minister Goh Chok Tong. The 'triangle of growth' was envisioned to be a key component of the Singapore regionalisation scheme of the 1980s and 1990s, relocating labour-intensive industries to neighbouring places such as the Malaysian state of Johor (known as the Iskandar Development Region) and the island of Batam in the nearby Indonesian province of Riau (at the time, before splitting off as a part of Riau Islands province in 2004).

As more Malaysian and Indonesian states joined the grouping, the IMS-GT was formed to formalise the new grouping. A Memorandum of Understanding (MOU) was signed on 17 December 1994 by the representatives of the participating countries; Singapore's Deputy Prime Minister Lee Hsien Loong, Malaysia' s International Trade and Industry Minister Datuk Seri Rafidah Aziz and Indonesia's Coordinating Minister for Trade and Industry Hartono.

Even with the low wages on Batam, some companies find themselves struggling with rising costs. Nidec, a Japanese conglomerate, has moved its factory from Batam to Vietnam due to labour costs.

Statistics
Batam is a tax free export zone rather than a free port, therefore much industry is limited to international exports.  Batam has also become an alternate air transport hub as Java's airports are congested.  Some 62,000 Singaporeans visited Batam in January 2012, compared with stronger links to Johor, some 70,000 daily. 

sources: (Budan Pusat Statistik 2010 Census Indonesia, Statistics Singapore, Statistics Malaysia)
 Malaysia 2010 Census for Districts.
 Statistics Indonesia Publikasi Provinsi dan Kabupaten Hasil Sementara SP2010
 April 2012 Civil Survey for Batam.

For GDP stats, Riau Island's Quarterly GDP output was Rp26.510.648,31 mln (Q1/14, US$2.3 billion or US$9 billion annual)  Singapore's Quarterly GDP was 95,959.1 mln (Q1/14, $76.57 billion or US$310 billion annual) and Johor Bahru state was RM24,452 per capita (entire 2012, US$26 billion annual).

See also
 Brunei–Indonesia–Malaysia–Philippines East ASEAN Growth Area (BIMP-EAGA)
 Timor Leste–Indonesia–Australia Growth Triangle (TIA-GT)
 Indonesia–Malaysia–Thailand Growth Triangle (IMT-GT)
 ASEAN kecil, a proposed joint defence scheme for Malaysia, Singapore and Indonesia
 Singapore Strait crossing
 List of metropolitan areas in Indonesia
Golden triangle

References

Maritime Southeast Asia
Economy of Indonesia
Transborder agglomerations
Foreign trade of Malaysia
Economy of Singapore
Johor
Batam
Malaysia–Singapore relations
Indonesia–Malaysia relations
Indonesia–Singapore relations
Foreign trade of Indonesia